Gudeodiscus phlyarius is a species of air-breathing land snail, a terrestrial pulmonate gastropod mollusk in the family Plectopylidae.

Gudeodiscus phlyarius is the type species of the genus Gudeodiscus.

Distribution
The distribution of Gudeodiscus phlyarius includes Vietnam.

Ecology
It is a ground-dwelling species as all other plectopylid snails in Vietnam.

It co-occur with other plectopylids in Vietnam: with Gudeodiscus anceyi, Gudeodiscus messageri raheemi and with Gudeodiscus villedaryi. Gudeodiscus francoisi, Gudeodiscus giardi, Sicradiscus mansuyi, Gudeodiscus dautzenbergi and Gudeodiscus suprafilaris live at geographically close sites to Gudeodiscus phlyarius.

References

External links

Plectopylidae
Gastropods described in 1887
Taxa named by Jules François Mabille